The 1995 World Polo Championship was played in St. Moritz, Switzerland during 1995 and was won by Brazil. This event brought together six teams from around the world.

Final rankings

External links

 1995 FIP World Championship IV

1995
P
1995 in polo